

Peerage of England, Scotland and Great Britain

Dukes

|colspan=5 style="background: #fcc" align="center"|Peerage of England
|-
|Duke of Cornwall (1337)||George, Prince of Wales||1762||1820||
|-
|Duke of Norfolk (1483)||Edward Howard, 9th Duke of Norfolk||1732||1777||
|-
|Duke of Somerset (1547)||Edward Seymour, 9th Duke of Somerset||1757||1792||
|-
|Duke of Cleveland (1670)||William FitzRoy, 3rd Duke of Cleveland||1730||1774||
|-
|Duke of Richmond (1675)||Charles Lennox, 3rd Duke of Richmond||1750||1806||
|-
|Duke of Grafton (1675)||Augustus FitzRoy, 3rd Duke of Grafton||1757||1811||
|-
|Duke of Beaufort (1682)||Henry Somerset, 5th Duke of Beaufort||1756||1803||
|-
|Duke of St Albans (1684)||George Beauclerk, 3rd Duke of St Albans||1751||1786||
|-
|rowspan=2|Duke of Bolton (1689)||Charles Powlett, 5th Duke of Bolton||1759||1765||Died
|-
|Harry Powlett, 6th Duke of Bolton||1765||1794||
|-
|Duke of Leeds (1694)||Thomas Osborne, 4th Duke of Leeds||1731||1789||
|-
|Duke of Bedford (1694)||John Russell, 4th Duke of Bedford||1732||1771||
|-
|rowspan=2|Duke of Devonshire (1694)||William Cavendish, 4th Duke of Devonshire||1755||1764||Died
|-
|William Cavendish, 5th Duke of Devonshire||1764||1811||
|-
|Duke of Marlborough (1702)||George Spencer, 4th Duke of Marlborough||1758||1817||
|-
|Duke of Rutland (1703)||John Manners, 3rd Duke of Rutland||1721||1779||
|-
|colspan=5 style="background: #fcc" align="center"|Peerage of Scotland
|-
|rowspan=2|Duke of Hamilton (1643)||James Hamilton, 7th Duke of Hamilton||1758||1769||Died
|-
|Douglas Hamilton, 8th Duke of Hamilton||1769||1799||
|-
|Duke of Buccleuch (1663)||Henry Scott, 3rd Duke of Buccleuch||1751||1812||
|-
|Duke of Queensberry (1684)||Charles Douglas, 3rd Duke of Queensberry||1711||1778||
|-
|Duke of Gordon (1684)||Alexander Gordon, 4th Duke of Gordon||1752||1827||
|-
|rowspan=2|Duke of Argyll (1701)||Archibald Campbell, 3rd Duke of Argyll||1743||1761||Died
|-
|John Campbell, 4th Duke of Argyll||1761||1770||
|-
|rowspan=2|Duke of Atholl (1703)||James Murray, 2nd Duke of Atholl||1724||1764||Died
|-
|John Murray, 3rd Duke of Atholl||1764||1774||
|-
|Duke of Douglas (1703)||Archibald Douglas, 1st Duke of Douglas||1703||1761||Died, Dukedom extinct
|-
|Duke of Montrose (1707)||William Graham, 2nd Duke of Montrose||1742||1790||
|-
|Duke of Roxburghe (1707)||John Ker, 3rd Duke of Roxburghe||1755||1804||
|-
|colspan=5 style="background: #fcc" align="center"|Peerage of Great Britain
|-
|Duke of Ancaster and Kesteven (1715)||Peregrine Bertie, 3rd Duke of Ancaster and Kesteven||1742||1778||
|-
|Duke of Kingston-upon-Hull (1715)||Evelyn Pierrepont, 2nd Duke of Kingston-upon-Hull||1726||1773||
|-
|Duke of Newcastle (1715)||Thomas Pelham-Holles, 1st Duke of Newcastle||1715||1768||Died, title extinct
|-
|rowspan=2|Duke of Portland (1716)||William Bentinck, 2nd Duke of Portland||1726||1762||Died
|-
|William Cavendish-Bentinck, 3rd Duke of Portland||1762||1809||
|-
|rowspan=2|Duke of Manchester (1719)||Robert Montagu, 3rd Duke of Manchester||1739||1762||Died
|-
|George Montagu, 4th Duke of Manchester||1762||1788||
|-
|Duke of Chandos (1719)||Henry Brydges, 2nd Duke of Chandos||1744||1771||
|-
|rowspan=3|Duke of Dorset (1720)||Lionel Sackville, 1st Duke of Dorset||1720||1765||Died
|-
|Charles Sackville, 2nd Duke of Dorset||1765||1769||Died
|-
|John Sackville, 3rd Duke of Dorset||1769||1799||
|-
|Duke of Bridgewater (1720)||Francis Egerton, 3rd Duke of Bridgewater||1748||1803||
|-
|Duke of Cumberland (1726)||Prince William, Duke of Cumberland||1726||1765||Died, title extinct
|-
|Duke of Newcastle-under-Lyne (1756)||Henry Pelham-Clinton, 2nd Duke of Newcastle||1768||1794||Title previously held by the Duke of Newcastle upon Tyne
|-
|Duke of York and Albany (1760)||Prince Edward, Duke of York and Albany||1760||1767||New creation; died, title extinct
|-
|Duke of Gloucester and Edinburgh (1764)||Prince William Henry, Duke of Gloucester and Edinburgh||1764||1805||New creation
|-
|Duke of Northumberland (1766)||Hugh Percy, 1st Duke of Northumberland||1766||1786||New creation
|-
|Duke of Cumberland and Strathearn (1766)||Prince Henry, Duke of Cumberland and Strathearn||1766||1790||New creation
|-
|Duke of Montagu (1766)||George Montagu, 1st Duke of Montagu||1766||1790||New creation
|-
|}

Marquesses

|colspan=5 style="background: #fcc" align="center"|Peerage of England
|-
|colspan=5 align="center"|-
|-
|colspan=5 style="background: #fcc" align="center"|Peerage of Scotland
|-
|rowspan=2|Marquess of Tweeddale (1694)||John Hay, 4th Marquess of Tweeddale||1715||1762||Died
|-
|George Hay, 5th Marquess of Tweeddale||1762||1770||
|-
|rowspan=2|Marquess of Lothian (1701)||William Kerr, 3rd Marquess of Lothian||1722||1767||Died
|-
|William Kerr, 4th Marquess of Lothian||1767||1775||
|-
|Marquess of Annandale (1701)||George Vanden-Bempde, 3rd Marquess of Annandale||1730||1792||
|-
|colspan=5 style="background: #fcc" align="center"|Peerage of Great Britain
|-
|Marquess Grey (1740)||Jemima Yorke, 2nd Marchioness Grey||1740||1797||
|-
|Marquess of Rockingham (1746)||Charles Watson-Wentworth, 2nd Marquess of Rockingham||1750||1782||
|-
|}

Earls

|colspan=5 style="background: #fcc" align="center"|Peerage of England
|-
|Earl of Shrewsbury (1442)||George Talbot, 14th Earl of Shrewsbury||1743||1787||
|-
|Earl of Derby (1485)||Edward Stanley, 11th Earl of Derby||1736||1776||
|-
|Earl of Huntingdon (1529)||Francis Hastings, 10th Earl of Huntingdon||1746||1789||
|-
|Earl of Pembroke (1551)||Henry Herbert, 10th Earl of Pembroke||1749||1794||
|-
|rowspan=2|Earl of Devon (1553)||William Courtenay, de jure 7th Earl of Devon||1735||1762||Died
|-
|William Courtenay, de jure 8th Earl of Devon||1762||1788||
|-
|Earl of Lincoln (1572)||Henry Clinton, 9th Earl of Lincoln||1730||1794||Succeeded to the Dukedom of Newcastle, see above
|-
|Earl of Suffolk (1603)||Henry Howard, 12th Earl of Suffolk||1757||1779||
|-
|Earl of Exeter (1605)||Brownlow Cecil, 9th Earl of Exeter||1754||1793||
|-
|Earl of Salisbury (1605)||James Cecil, 6th Earl of Salisbury||1728||1780||
|-
|rowspan=2|Earl of Northampton (1618)||Charles Compton, 7th Earl of Northampton||1758||1763||Died
|-
|Spencer Compton, 8th Earl of Northampton||1763||1796||
|-
|Earl of Denbigh (1622)||Basil Feilding, 6th Earl of Denbigh||1755||1800||
|-
|rowspan=2|Earl of Westmorland (1624)||John Fane, 7th Earl of Westmorland||1736||1762||Died
|-
|Thomas Fane, 8th Earl of Westmorland||1762||1771||
|-
|Earl of Peterborough (1628)||Charles Mordaunt, 4th Earl of Peterborough||1735||1779||
|-
|rowspan=2|Earl of Stamford (1628)||Harry Grey, 4th Earl of Stamford||1739||1768||Died
|-
|George Grey, 5th Earl of Stamford||1768||1819||
|-
|rowspan=2|Earl of Winchilsea (1628)||Daniel Finch, 8th Earl of Winchilsea||1730||1769||Died
|-
|George Finch, 9th Earl of Winchilsea||1769||1826||
|-
|Earl of Chesterfield (1628)||Philip Stanhope, 4th Earl of Chesterfield||1726||1773||
|-
|Earl of Thanet (1628)||Sackville Tufton, 8th Earl of Thanet||1753||1786||
|-
|Earl of Sandwich (1660)||John Montagu, 4th Earl of Sandwich||1729||1792||
|-
|Earl of Anglesey (1661)||Richard Annesley, 6th Earl of Anglesey||1737||1761||Died, title extinct
|-
|Earl of Cardigan (1661)||George Brudenell, 4th Earl of Cardigan||1732||1790||Created Duke of Montagu, see above
|-
|Earl of Essex (1661)||William Capell, 4th Earl of Essex||1743||1799||
|-
|Earl of Carlisle (1661)||Frederick Howard, 5th Earl of Carlisle||1758||1825||
|-
|Earl of Shaftesbury (1672)||Anthony Ashley Cooper, 4th Earl of Shaftesbury||1713||1771||
|-
|Earl of Lichfield (1674)||George Lee, 3rd Earl of Lichfield||1742||1772||
|-
|Earl of Berkeley (1679)||Frederick Augustus Berkeley, 5th Earl of Berkeley||1755||1810||
|-
|rowspan=2|Earl of Abingdon (1682)||Willoughby Bertie, 3rd Earl of Abingdon||1743||1760||Died
|-
|Willoughby Bertie, 4th Earl of Abingdon||1760||1799||
|-
|Earl of Gainsborough (1682)||Henry Noel, 6th Earl of Gainsborough||1759||1798||
|-
|Earl of Plymouth (1682)||Other Windsor, 4th Earl of Plymouth||1732||1771||
|-
|Earl of Holderness (1682)||Robert Darcy, 4th Earl of Holderness||1722||1778||
|-
|Earl of Stafford (1688)||John Paul Stafford-Howard, 4th Earl of Stafford||1751||1762||Died, title extinct
|-
|Earl of Scarbrough (1690)||Richard Lumley-Saunderson, 4th Earl of Scarbrough||1752||1782||
|-
|Earl of Bradford (1694)||Thomas Newport, 4th Earl of Bradford||1734||1762||Died, title extinct
|-
|Earl of Rochford (1695)||William Nassau de Zuylestein, 4th Earl of Rochford||1738||1781||
|-
|Earl of Albemarle (1697)||George Keppel, 3rd Earl of Albemarle||1754||1772||
|-
|Earl of Coventry (1697)||George Coventry, 6th Earl of Coventry||1751||1809||
|-
|rowspan=2|Earl of Jersey (1697)||William Villiers, 3rd Earl of Jersey||1721||1769||Died
|-
|George Villiers, 4th Earl of Jersey||1769||1805||
|-
|rowspan=2|Earl Poulett (1706)||John Poulett, 2nd Earl Poulett||1743||1764||Died
|-
|Vere Poulett, 3rd Earl Poulett||1764||1788||
|-
|Earl of Godolphin (1706)||Francis Godolphin, 2nd Earl of Godolphin||1712||1766||Died, title extinct
|-
|Earl of Cholmondeley (1706)||George Cholmondeley, 3rd Earl of Cholmondeley||1733||1770||
|-
|colspan=5 style="background: #fcc" align="center"|Peerage of Scotland
|-
|Earl of Crawford (1398)||George Lindsay-Crawford, 21st Earl of Crawford||1749||1781||
|-
|Earl of Erroll (1452)||James Hay, 15th Earl of Erroll||1758||1778||
|-
|rowspan=2|Earl of Sutherland (1235)||William Sutherland, 18th Earl of Sutherland||1750||1766||
|-
|Elizabeth Gordon, 19th Countess of Sutherland||1766||1839||
|-
|rowspan=2|Earl of Rothes (1458)||John Leslie, 10th Earl of Rothes||1722||1767||Died
|-
|John Leslie, 11th Earl of Rothes||1767||1773||
|-
|rowspan=2|Earl of Morton (1458)||James Douglas, 14th Earl of Morton||1738||1768||Died
|-
|Sholto Douglas, 15th Earl of Morton||1768||1774||
|-
|Earl of Glencairn (1488)||William Cunningham, 13th Earl of Glencairn||1734||1775||
|-
|rowspan=2|Earl of Eglinton (1507)||Alexander Montgomerie, 10th Earl of Eglinton||1729||1769||Died
|-
|Archibald Montgomerie, 11th Earl of Eglinton||1769||1796||
|-
|Earl of Cassilis (1509)||Thomas Kennedy, 9th Earl of Cassilis||1759||1775||
|-
|rowspan=2|Earl of Caithness (1455)||Alexander Sinclair, 9th Earl of Caithness||1705||1765||Died
|-
|William Sinclair, 10th Earl of Caithness||1765||1779||
|-
|rowspan=2|Earl of Buchan (1469)||Henry Erskine, 10th Earl of Buchan||1745||1767||Died
|-
|David Erskine, 11th Earl of Buchan||1767||1829||
|-
|rowspan=2|Earl of Moray (1562)||James Stuart, 8th Earl of Moray||1739||1767||Died
|-
|Francis Stuart, 9th Earl of Moray||1767||1810||
|-
|rowspan=2|Earl of Home (1605)||William Home, 8th Earl of Home||1720||1761||Died
|-
|Alexander Home, 9th Earl of Home||1761||1786||
|-
|Earl of Abercorn (1606)||James Hamilton, 8th Earl of Abercorn||1744||1789||
|-
|Earl of Strathmore and Kinghorne (1606)||John Bowes, 9th Earl of Strathmore and Kinghorne||1753||1776||
|-
|Earl of Kellie (1619)||Thomas Erskine, 6th Earl of Kellie||1758||1781||
|-
|Earl of Haddington (1619)||Thomas Hamilton, 7th Earl of Haddington||1735||1794||
|-
|Earl of Galloway (1623)||Alexander Stewart, 6th Earl of Galloway||1746||1773||
|-
|Earl of Lauderdale (1624)||James Maitland, 7th Earl of Lauderdale||1744||1789||
|-
|Earl of Loudoun (1633)||John Campbell, 4th Earl of Loudoun||1731||1782||
|-
|Earl of Kinnoull (1633)||Thomas Hay, 9th Earl of Kinnoull||1758||1787||
|-
|rowspan=2|Earl of Dumfries (1633)||William Dalrymple-Crichton, 5th Earl of Dumfries||1742||1769||Died
|-
|Patrick McDouall-Crichton, 6th Earl of Dumfries||1769||1803||
|-
|Earl of Elgin (1633)||Charles Bruce, 5th Earl of Elgin||1747||1771||
|-
|rowspan=2|Earl of Traquair (1633)||Charles Stewart, 5th Earl of Traquair||1741||1764||Died
|-
|John Stewart, 6th Earl of Traquair||1764||1779||
|-
|rowspan=2|Earl of Dalhousie (1633)||Charles Ramsay, 7th Earl of Dalhousie||1739||1764||Died
|-
|George Ramsay, 8th Earl of Dalhousie||1764||1787||
|-
|rowspan=2|Earl of Findlater (1638)||James Ogilvy, 5th Earl of Findlater||1730||1764||Died
|-
|James Ogilvy, 6th Earl of Findlater||1764||1770||
|-
|Earl of Leven (1641)||David Leslie, 6th Earl of Leven||1754||1802||
|-
|Earl of Dysart (1643)||Lionel Tollemache, 4th Earl of Dysart||1727||1770||
|-
|Earl of Selkirk (1646)||Dunbar Douglas, 4th Earl of Selkirk||1744||1799||
|-
|Earl of Northesk (1647)||George Carnegie, 6th Earl of Northesk||1741||1792||
|-
|rowspan=2|Earl of Balcarres (1651)||James Lindsay, 5th Earl of Balcarres||1736||1768||Died
|-
|Alexander Lindsay, 6th Earl of Balcarres||1768||1825||
|-
|Earl of Aboyne (1660)||Charles Gordon, 4th Earl of Aboyne||1732||1794||
|-
|Earl of Newburgh (1660)||James Radclyffe, 4th Earl of Newburgh||1755||1786||
|-
|Earl of Dundonald (1669)||Thomas Cochrane, 8th Earl of Dundonald||1758||1778||
|-
|Earl of Kintore (1677)||William Keith, 4th Earl of Kintore||1758||1761||Died; Peerage dormant
|-
|Earl of Breadalbane and Holland (1677)||John Campbell, 3rd Earl of Breadalbane and Holland||1752||1782||
|-
|Earl of Aberdeen (1682)||George Gordon, 3rd Earl of Aberdeen||1746||1801||
|-
|Earl of Dunmore (1686)||John Murray, 4th Earl of Dunmore||1752||1809||
|-
|Earl of Orkney (1696)||Mary O'Brien, 3rd Countess of Orkney||1756||1790||
|-
|Earl of March (1697)||William Douglas, 3rd Earl of March||1731||1810||
|-
|Earl of Marchmont (1697)||Hugh Hume-Campbell, 3rd Earl of Marchmont||1740||1794||
|-
|rowspan=2|Earl of Hyndford (1701)||John Carmichael, 3rd Earl of Hyndford||1737||1766||Died
|-
|John Carmichael, 4th Earl of Hyndford||1766||1787||
|-
|rowspan=3|Earl of Stair (1703)||James Dalrymple, 3rd Earl of Stair||1747||1760||Died
|-
|William Dalrymple-Crichton, 4th Earl of Stair||1760||1768||
|-
|John Dalrymple, 5th Earl of Stair||1768||1789||
|-
|rowspan=2|Earl of Rosebery (1703)||James Primrose, 2nd Earl of Rosebery||1723||1765||Died
|-
|Neil Primrose, 3rd Earl of Rosebery||1765||1814||
|-
|Earl of Glasgow (1703)||John Boyle, 3rd Earl of Glasgow||1740||1775||
|-
|Earl of Portmore (1703)||Charles Colyear, 2nd Earl of Portmore||1730||1785||
|-
|Earl of Bute (1703)||John Stuart, 3rd Earl of Bute||1723||1792||
|-
|Earl of Hopetoun (1703)||John Hope, 2nd Earl of Hopetoun||1742||1781||
|-
|Earl of Deloraine (1706)||Henry Scott, 4th Earl of Deloraine||1740||1807||
|-
|colspan=5 style="background: #fcc" align="center"|Peerage of Great Britain
|-
|Earl of Oxford and Mortimer (1711)||Edward Harley, 4th Earl of Oxford and Earl Mortimer||1755||1790||
|-
|Earl of Strafford (1711)||William Wentworth, 2nd Earl of Strafford||1739||1791||
|-
|rowspan=2|Earl Ferrers (1711)||Laurence Shirley, 4th Earl Ferrers||1745||1760||Died
|-
|Washington Shirley, 5th Earl Ferrers||1760||1778||
|-
|Earl of Dartmouth (1711)||William Legge, 2nd Earl of Dartmouth||1750||1801||
|-
|rowspan=2|Earl of Tankerville (1714)||Charles Bennet, 3rd Earl of Tankerville||1753||1767||Died
|-
|Charles Bennet, 4th Earl of Tankerville||1767||1822||
|-
|Earl of Aylesford (1714)||Heneage Finch, 3rd Earl of Aylesford||1757||1777||
|-
|Earl of Bristol (1714)||George Hervey, 2nd Earl of Bristol||1751||1775||
|-
|Earl of Uxbridge (1714)||Henry Paget, 2nd Earl of Uxbridge||1743||1769||Died; Peerage extinct
|-
|rowspan=2|Earl Granville (1715)||John Carteret, 2nd Earl Granville||1744||1763||Died
|-
|Robert Carteret, 3rd Earl Granville||1763||1776||
|-
|Earl of Halifax (1715)||George Montagu-Dunk, 2nd Earl of Halifax||1739||1771||
|-
|Earl of Sussex (1717)||Henry Yelverton, 3rd Earl of Sussex||1758||1799||
|-
|rowspan=2|Earl Cowper (1718)||William Clavering-Cowper, 2nd Earl Cowper||1723||1764||Died
|-
|George Clavering-Cowper, 3rd Earl Cowper||1764||1789||
|-
|Earl Stanhope (1718)||Philip Stanhope, 2nd Earl Stanhope||1721||1786||
|-
|Earl Coningsby (1719)||Margaret Newton, 2nd Countess Coningsby||1729||1761||Died; Peerage extinct
|-
|Earl of Harborough (1719)||Bennet Sherard, 3rd Earl of Harborough||1750||1770||
|-
|rowspan=2|Earl of Macclesfield (1721)||George Parker, 2nd Earl of Macclesfield||1732||1764||Died
|-
|Thomas Parker, 3rd Earl of Macclesfield||1764||1795||
|-
|Earl of Pomfret (1721)||George Fermor, 2nd Earl of Pomfret||1753||1785||
|-
|Countess of Walsingham (1722)||Melusina von der Schulenburg, Countess of Walsingham||1722||1778||
|-
|rowspan=2|Earl Waldegrave (1729)||James Waldegrave, 2nd Earl Waldegrave||1741||1763||Died
|-
|John Waldegrave, 3rd Earl Waldegrave||1763||1784||
|-
|Earl of Ashburnham (1730)||John Ashburnham, 2nd Earl of Ashburnham||1737||1812||
|-
|rowspan=2|Earl of Effingham (1731)||Thomas Howard, 2nd Earl of Effingham||1743||1763||Died
|-
|Thomas Howard, 3rd Earl of Effingham||1763||1791||
|-
|Countess of Yarmouth (1740)||Amalie von Wallmoden, Countess of Yarmouth||1743||1765||Died; Peerage extinct
|-
|Earl of Orford (1742)||George Walpole, 3rd Earl of Orford||1751||1791||
|-
|Earl of Harrington (1742)||William Stanhope, 2nd Earl of Harrington||1756||1779||
|-
|Earl of Bath (1742)||William Pulteney, 1st Earl of Bath||1742||1764||Died; Peerage extinct
|-
|rowspan=2|Earl of Portsmouth (1743)||John Wallop, 1st Earl of Portsmouth||1743||1762||Died
|-
|John Wallop, 2nd Earl of Portsmouth||1762||1797||
|-
|Earl Brooke (1746)||Francis Greville, 1st Earl Brooke||1746||1773||
|-
|Earl Gower (1746)||Granville Leveson-Gower, 2nd Earl Gower||1754||1803||
|-
|Earl of Buckinghamshire (1746)||John Hobart, 2nd Earl of Buckinghamshire||1756||1793||
|-
|Earl Fitzwilliam (1746)||William Fitzwilliam, 2nd Earl Fitzwilliam||1756||1833||
|-
|Earl of Powis (1748)||Henry Herbert, 1st Earl of Powis||1748||1772||
|-
|Earl of Northumberland (1749)||Hugh Percy, 2nd Earl of Northumberland||1750||1786||Created Duke of Northumberland, see above
|-
|rowspan=2|Earl of Egremont (1748)||Charles Wyndham, 2nd Earl of Egremont||1750||1763||Died
|-
|George Wyndham, 3rd Earl of Egremont||1763||1837||
|-
|Earl Temple (1749)||Richard Grenville-Temple, 2nd Earl Temple||1752||1779||
|-
|Earl Harcourt (1749)||Simon Harcourt, 1st Earl Harcourt||1749||1777||
|-
|Earl of Hertford (1750)||Francis Seymour-Conway, 1st Earl of Hertford||1750||1794||
|-
|Earl of Guilford (1752)||Francis North, 1st Earl of Guilford||1752||1790||
|-
|rowspan=2|Earl Cornwallis (1753)||Charles Cornwallis, 1st Earl Cornwallis||1753||1762||Died
|-
|Charles Cornwallis, 2nd Earl Cornwallis||1762||1805||
|-
|rowspan=2|Earl of Hardwicke (1754)||Philip Yorke, 1st Earl of Hardwicke||1753||1764||Died
|-
|Philip Yorke, 2nd Earl of Hardwicke||1764||1790||
|-
|Earl of Darlington (1754)||Henry Vane, 2nd Earl of Darlington||1758||1792||
|-
|Earl Fauconberg (1756)||Thomas Belasyse, 1st Earl Fauconberg||1756||1774||
|-
|Earl of Ilchester (1756)||Stephen Fox-Strangways, 1st Earl of Ilchester||1756||1776||
|-
|rowspan=2|Earl De La Warr (1761)||John West, 1st Earl De La Warr||1761||1766||New creation; died
|-
|John West, 2nd Earl De La Warr||1766||1777||
|-
|Earl Talbot (1761)||William Talbot, 1st Earl Talbot||1761||1782||New creation
|-
|Earl of Northington (1764)||Robert Henley, 1st Earl of Northington||1764||1772||New creation
|-
|Earl of Radnor (1765)||William Bouverie, 1st Earl of Radnor||1765||1776||New creation
|-
|Earl Spencer (1765)||John Spencer, 1st Earl Spencer||1765||1783||New creation
|-
|Earl of Chatham (1766)||William Pitt, 1st Earl of Chatham||1766||1778||New creation
|-
|Earl Ligonier (1766)||John Ligonier, 1st Earl Ligonier||1766||1770||New creation
|-
|}

Viscounts

|colspan=5 style="background: #fcc" align="center"|Peerage of England
|-
|rowspan=2|Viscount Hereford (1550)||Edward Devereux, 11th Viscount Hereford||1748||1760||Died
|-
|Edward Devereux, 12th Viscount Hereford||1760||1783||
|-
|rowspan=2|Viscount Montagu (1554)||Anthony Browne, 6th Viscount Montagu||1717||1767||Died
|-
|Anthony Browne, 7th Viscount Montagu||1767||1787||
|-
|Viscount Saye and Sele (1624)||Richard Fiennes, 6th Viscount Saye and Sele||1742||1781||
|-
|rowspan=2|Viscount Hatton (1682)||William Seton Hatton, 2nd Viscount Hatton||1706||1760||Died
|-
|Henry Charles Hatton, 3rd Viscount Hatton||1760||1762||Died, title extinct
|-
|rowspan=2|Viscount Townshend (1682)||Charles Townshend, 3rd Viscount Townshend||1738||1764||Died
|-
|George Townshend, 4th Viscount Townshend||1764||1807||
|-
|Viscount Weymouth (1682)||Thomas Thynne, 3rd Viscount Weymouth||1751||1796||
|-
|colspan=5 style="background: #fcc" align="center"|Peerage of Scotland
|-
|Viscount of Falkland (1620)||Lucius Cary, 7th Viscount Falkland||1730||1785||
|-
|Viscount of Stormont (1621)||David Murray, 7th Viscount of Stormont||1748||1796||
|-
|Viscount of Arbuthnott (1641)||John Arbuthnot, 6th Viscount of Arbuthnott||1756||1791||
|-
|rowspan=3|Viscount of Irvine (1661)||Henry Ingram, 7th Viscount of Irvine||1736||1761||Died
|-
|George Ingram, 8th Viscount of Irvine||1761||1763||Died
|-
|Charles Ingram, 9th Viscount of Irvine||1763||1778||
|-
|colspan=5 style="background: #fcc" align="center"|Peerage of Great Britain
|-
|Viscount Bolingbroke (1712)||Frederick St John, 2nd Viscount Bolingbroke||1751||1787||
|-
|Viscount Falmouth (1720)||Hugh Boscawen, 2nd Viscount Falmouth||1734||1782||
|-
|Viscount Torrington (1721)||George Byng, 4th Viscount Torrington||1750||1812||
|-
|Viscount Leinster (1747)||James FitzGerald, 1st Viscount Leinster||1747||1773||Earl of Kildare in the Peerage of Ireland
|-
|rowspan=2|Viscount Folkestone (1747)||Jacob Bouverie, 1st Viscount Folkestone||1747||1761||Died
|-
|William Bouverie, 2nd Viscount Folkestone||1761||1776||Created Earl of Radnor, see above
|-
|rowspan=2|Viscount Courtenay (1762)||William Courtenay, 1st Viscount Courtenay||1762||1762||New creation; died
|-
|William Courtenay, 2nd Viscount Courtenay||1762||1788||
|-
|Viscount Wentworth (1762)||Edward Noel, 1st Viscount Wentworth||1762||1774||New creation
|-
|Viscount Dudley and Ward (1763)||John Ward, 1st Viscount Dudley and Ward||1763||1774||New creation
|-
|Viscount Maynard (1766)||Charles Maynard, 1st Viscount Maynard||1766||1775||New creation
|-
|}

Barons

|colspan=5 style="background: #fcc" align="center"|Peerage of England
|-
|Baron le Despencer (1264)||Francis Dashwood, 11th Baron le Despencer||1763||1781||Abeyance terminated
|- 
|Baron Clinton (1299)||Margaret Rolle, 15th Baroness Clinton||1760||1781||Abeyance terminated
|- 
|Baron Ferrers of Chartley (1299)||Charlotte Townshend, 16th Baroness Ferrers of Chartley||1749||1770||
|- 
|Baron de Clifford (1299)||Margaret Coke, 19th Baroness de Clifford||1734||1775||
|- 
|Baron Botetourt (1305)||Norborne Berkeley, 4th Baron Botetourt||1764||1770||Abeyance terminated
|- 
|Baron Dacre (1321)||Thomas Barrett-Lennard, 17th Baron Dacre||1755||1786||
|- 
|Baron Stourton (1448)||William Stourton, 16th Baron Stourton||1753||1781||
|- 
|Baron Willoughby de Broke (1491)||John Peyto-Verney, 14th Baron Willoughby de Broke||1752||1816||
|- 
|Baron Wentworth (1529)||Edward Noel, 9th Baron Wentworth||1745||1774||Created Viscount Wentworth, see above
|-
|Baron Wharton (1544)||Jane Wharton, 7th Baroness Wharton||1739||1761||Died, Barony fell into abeyance
|-
|rowspan=2|Baron Willoughby of Parham (1547)||Hugh Willoughby, 15th Baron Willoughby of Parham||1715||1765||Died
|-
|Henry Willoughby, 16th Baron Willoughby of Parham||1767||1775||
|-
|Baron Paget (1552)||Henry Paget, 9th Baron Paget||1769||1812||Title previously held by the Earls of Uxbridge
|-
|Baron Hunsdon (1559)||William Ferdinand Carey, 8th Baron Hunsdon||1702||1765||Died, title extinct
|-
|rowspan=2|Baron St John of Bletso (1559)||John St John, 12th Baron St John of Bletso||1757||1767||Died
|-
|Henry St John, 13th Baron St John of Bletso||1767||1805||
|-
|Baron De La Warr (1570)||John West, 7th Baron De La Warr||1723||1766||Created Earl De La Warr, see above
|-
|Baron Petre (1603)||Robert Petre, 9th Baron Petre||1742||1801||
|-
|Baron Arundell of Wardour (1605)||Henry Arundell, 8th Baron Arundell of Wardour||1756||1808||
|-
|rowspan=2|Baron Dormer (1615)||Charles Dormer, 6th Baron Dormer||1728||1761||Died
|-
|John Dormer, 7th Baron Dormer||1761||1785||
|-
|Baron Teynham (1616)||Henry Roper, 10th Baron Teynham||1727||1781||
|-
|rowspan=3|Baron Craven (1627)||Fulwar Craven, 4th Baron Craven||1739||1764||Died
|-
|William Craven, 5th Baron Craven||1764||1769||
|-
|William Craven, 6th Baron Craven||1769||1791||
|-
|Baron Clifford (1628)||William Cavendish, 7th Baron Clifford||1754||1811||Succeeded to the Dukedom of Devonshire, see above
|-
|Baron Strange (1628)||Charlotte Murray, 8th Baroness Strange||1764||1805||Title previously held by the Duke of Atholl
|-
|Baron Maynard (1628)||Charles Maynard, 6th Baron Maynard||1745||1775||Created Viscount Maynard, see above
|-
|Baron Leigh (1643)||Edward Leigh, 5th Baron Leigh||1749||1786||
|-
|Baron Byron (1643)||William Byron, 5th Baron Byron||1736||1798||
|-
|Baron Ward (1644)||John Ward, 6th Baron Ward||1740||1774||Created Viscount Dudley, see above
|-
|Baron Langdale (1658)||Marmaduke Langdale, 4th Baron Langdale||1718||1771||
|-
|Baron Berkeley of Stratton (1658)||John Berkeley, 5th Baron Berkeley of Stratton||1741||1773||
|-
|Baron Delamer (1661)||Nathaniel Booth, 4th Baron Delamer||1758||1770||
|-
|Baron Arundell of Trerice (1664)||John Arundell, 4th Baron Arundell of Trerice||1706||1768||Died, title extinct
|-
|Baron Clifford of Chudleigh (1672)||Hugh Clifford, 4th Baron Clifford of Chudleigh||1732||1783||
|-
|rowspan=2|Baron Willoughby of Parham (1680)||Hugh Willoughby, 15th Baron Willoughby of Parham||1715||1765||Died
|-
|Henry Willoughby, 16th Baron Willoughby of Parham||1767||1775||Claim to the title accepted in 1767
|-
|colspan=5 style="background: #fcc" align="center"|Peerage of Scotland
|-
|rowspan=2|Lord Somerville (1430)||James Somerville, 13th Lord Somerville||1709||1765||Died
|-
|James Somerville, 14th Lord Somerville||1765||1796||
|-
|rowspan=2|Lord Forbes (1442)||James Forbes, 15th Lord Forbes||1734||1761||Died
|-
|James Forbes, 16th Lord Forbes||1761||1804||
|-
|Lord Saltoun (1445)||George Fraser, 15th Lord Saltoun||1748||1781||
|-
|Lord Gray (1445)||John Gray, 11th Lord Gray||1738||1782||
|-
|Lord Borthwick (1452)||Henry Borthwick, 14th Lord Borthwick||1762||1772||Peerage previously dormant
|-
|Lord Cathcart (1460)||Charles Cathcart, 9th Lord Cathcart||1740||1776||
|-
|Lord Sempill (1489)||John Sempill, 13th Lord Sempill||1746||1782||
|-
|Lord Elphinstone (1509)||Charles Elphinstone, 10th Lord Elphinstone||1757||1781||
|-
|rowspan=2|Lord Torphichen (1564)||Walter Sandilands, 8th Lord Torphichen||1753||1765||Died
|-
|James Sandilands, 9th Lord Torphichen||1765||1815||
|-
|rowspan=2|Lord Lindores (1600)||Alexander Leslie, 6th Lord Lindores||1719||1765||Died
|-
|James Francis Leslie, 7th Lord Lindores||1765||1775||
|-
|Lord Colville of Culross (1604)||Alexander Colville, 7th Lord Colville of Culross||1741||1770||
|-
|Lord Blantyre (1606)||William Stuart, 9th Lord Blantyre||1751||1776||
|-
|Lord Cranstoun (1609)||James Cranstoun, 6th Lord Cranstoun||1727||1773||
|-
|rowspan=2|Lord Aston of Forfar (1627)||Walter Aston, 7th Lord Aston of Forfar||1755||1763||Died
|-
|Walter Aston, 8th Lord Aston of Forfar||1763||1805||
|-
|Lord Fairfax of Cameron (1627)||Thomas Fairfax, 6th Lord Fairfax of Cameron||1710||1781||
|-
|Lord Napier (1627)||Francis Napier, 6th Lord Napier||1706||1773||
|-
|rowspan=3|Lord Reay (1628)||Donald Mackay, 4th Lord Reay||1748||1761||Died
|-
|George Mackay, 5th Lord Reay||1761||1768||Died
|-
|Hugh Mackay, 6th Lord Reay||1768||1797||
|-
|rowspan=2|Lord Kirkcudbright (1633)||William Maclellan, 7th Lord Kirkcudbright||1730||1762||Died
|-
|John Maclellan, 8th Lord Kirkcudbright||1762||1801||
|-
|rowspan=2|Lord Forrester (1633)||William Forrester, 7th Lord Forrester||1748||1763||Died
|-
|Caroline Cockburn of Ormistoun, 8th Lady Forrester||1763||1784||
|-
|Lord Banff (1642)||Alexander Ogilvy, 7th Lord Banff||1746||1771||
|-
|Lord Elibank (1643)||Patrick Murray, 5th Lord Elibank||1736||1778||
|-
|rowspan=2|Lord Falconer of Halkerton (1646)||Alexander Falconer, 5th Lord Falconer of Halkerton||1751||1762||
|-
|William Falconer, 6th Lord Falconer of Halkerton||1762||1776||
|-
|rowspan=2|Lord Belhaven and Stenton (1647)||John Hamilton, 4th Lord Belhaven and Stenton||1721||1764||Died
|-
|James Hamilton, 5th Lord Belhaven and Stenton||1764||1777||
|-
|rowspan=2|Lord Rollo (1651)||Andrew Rollo, 5th Lord Rollo||1758||1763||Died
|-
|John Rollo, 6th Lord Rollo||1763||1783||
|-
|Lord Ruthven of Freeland (1650)||Isobel Ruthven, 4th Lady Ruthven of Freeland||1722||1783||
|-
|Lord Bellenden (1661)||John Ker Bellenden, 5th Lord Bellenden||1753||1796||
|-
|rowspan=2|Lord Kinnaird (1682)||Charles Kinnaird, 6th Lord Kinnaird||1758||1767||Died
|-
|George Kinnaird, 7th Lord Kinnaird||1767||1805||
|-
|}

References

 

1760
1760s in England
1760s in Ireland
1760s in Scotland
Peers
Peers
Peers
Peers
Peers
Peers
18th-century nobility